The 24th Legislative Assembly of Quebec was the Quebec, Canada provincial legislature that existed from July 16, 1952, to June 20, 1956. It was the Union Nationale's third consecutive term as the governing party and the fourth under the leadership of Maurice Duplessis.

Seats per political party

 After the 1952 elections

Member list

This was the list of members of the Legislative Assembly of Quebec that were elected in the 1952 election:

Other elected MLAs

Other MLAs were elected during by-elections in this mandate

 Clovis Gagnon, Union Nationale, Matapédia, July 9, 1953 
 Georges-Émile Lapalme, Quebec Liberal Party, Montréal-Outremont, July 9, 1953 
 Rosaire Chalifour, Union Nationale, Portneuf, July 9, 1953 
 John William French, Union Nationale, Compton, September 15, 1954 
 Arsène Gagné, Union Nationale, Montréal-Laurier, July 6, 1955 
 Pierre-Jacques-François Bousquet, Union Nationale, Saint-Hyacinthe,  July 6, 1955 
 John Richard Hyde, Quebec Liberal Party, Westmount-Saint-Georges, July 6, 1955

Cabinet Ministers

 Prime Minister and Executive Council President: Maurice Duplessis
 Agriculture: Laurent Barrée
 Colonization: Joseph-Damase Begin
 Labour: Antonio Barrette
 Public Works: Roméo Lorrain
 Social Welfare and Youth: Paul Sauvé 
 Health: Albiny Paquette
 Lands and Forests: John Samuel Bourque
 Hunting and Coastal Fisheries: Camille-Eugène Pouliot  
 Mines: Charles Daniel French (1952-1954), William McOuat Cottingham (1954-1956)
 Hydraulic resources: John Samuel Bourque
 Roads: Antonio Talbot
 Transportation and Communications: Antoine Rivard (1954-1956)
 Municipal Affairs: Bona Dussault (1952-1953), Yves Prevost (1953-1956)
 Industry and Commerce: Jean-Paul Beaulieu
 Attorney General: Maurice Duplessis
 Provincial Secretary: Omer Côté (1952-1956), Romeo Lorrain (1956)
 Solicitor General: Antoine Rivard
 Finances: Onésime Gagnon 
 State Ministers: Arthur Leclerc, Jacques Miquelon, Wilfrid Labbé

New electoral ridings

The electoral map was slightly modified in 1954 with the creation of Jonquière-Kenogami from parts of Chicoutimi. The change was effective in the 1956 elections.

References
 1952 election results
 List of historical Cabinet Ministers

24